Smashville may refer to:

Sports
 "Smashville", a nickname for the Nashville Predators
 Team Smashville, a people's choice winner at the 23 September 2017 Red Bull Flugtag

Games
 "Smashville", a level from Super Smash Bros. Brawl based on Animal Crossing
 "Smashville", a game level from the collectibles game Monsterpocalypse

Entertainment
 "SMASHVILLE" (song), a song written by Jim Van Cleve

See also
 Smash (disambiguation)